Ari'i-Otare Terii-maeva-rua III Pomare (28 May 1871 – 19 November 1932) was the last Queen of the Tahitian island of Bora Bora from 1873 to 1895.

The second daughter of Prince Tamatoa-a-tu (Tamatoa V), King of Raiātea and Tahaa and Princess Moe-a-Mai, Arii-Otare became the Queen of Bora Bora on the death of her aunt Princess Teriimaevarua II, Queen of Bora Bora. She married Prince Teri'i Hinoi-a-tua Pomare, chief of Hitia'a in Bora Bora on 9 January 1884 and was divorced in 1887. Ari'i-'Otare produced no children of her own. She adopted her two younger step daughters; Princess Rehu-rehu Tuheiava and Princess Itia Tuheiava. She also adopted and raised her biological nephew Moeterauri "Bimbo" Tetua who was born September 14, 1916.

Bora Bora was annexed by the French on 19 March 1888, but royal power remained in effect until her abdication on 21 September 1895. She remained the head of the royal house of Bora Bora until her death.

Ancestry

See also
French Polynesia
Annexation of the Leeward Islands
List of monarchs who lost their thrones in the 19th century

References 

1871 births
1932 deaths
French Polynesian royalty
Queens regnant in Oceania
19th-century women rulers
19th-century monarchs in Oceania
People from Bora Bora
Pōmare dynasty